Team Frøy–Bianchi was a UCI Continental cycling team based in Norway. The team was managed by Espen Hillmann with assistance from directeur sportif Carl Erik Pedersen and Pål Gulliksen. The team disbanded at the end of the 2015 season after failing to find a new main sponsor.

Team roster

References

External links
 

UCI Continental Teams (Europe)
Cycling teams based in Norway
Cycling teams established in 2012
Cycling teams disestablished in 2015
Defunct cycling teams based in Norway